Ion I. Câmpineanu (October 10, 1841 – November 13, 1888) was a Romanian statesman who served as the Minister of Justice from January 27, 1877 to September 23, 1877, Minister of Finance in two terms, from September 23, 1877 to November 25, 1878 and from February 25, 1880 to July 15, 1880, and Minister of Foreign Affairs from November 25, 1878 until July 10, 1879, He was one of the founders and most important members of the National Liberal Party.  

After the proclamation of the Kingdom of Romania, Ion I. Câmpineanu was appointed the Minister of Foreign Affairs and held the office from February 2, 1885 until October 27, 1885. He was then the Mayor of Bucharest in 1887 and then became the first Governor of National Bank of Romania, which he headed until his death on November 13, 1888. One of the central streets in Bucharest was named after Câmpineanu.

References

Romanian Ministers of Foreign Affairs
1841 births
1888 deaths
Romanian Ministers of Justice
Romanian Ministers of Finance
Romanian Ministers of Agriculture
Governors of the National Bank of Romania
Politicians from Bucharest